Nicholle "Nikki" Jean Leary is an American singer.

After studying theatre, Jean began her career as the lead singer of the Philadelphia-based band Nouveau Riche. She began posting acoustic music online. Jean gained major recognition after being featured on Lupe Fiasco's single "Hip-Hop Saved My Life" in 2008; she continues to work on frequent collaborations with him.

In 2011, Jean signed as a recording contract with indie record label S-Curve Records and released the concept album Pennies in a Jar, where she collaborated with songwriters such as Bob Dylan.  In 2014, she released her album Champagne Water EP (2014) and, in 2018, she signed a recording contract with Rhymesayers Entertainment for the release of her album Beautiful Prison (2019).

Early life 
Nikki Jean was born in St. Paul, Minnesota, United States. She moved around with her mother and spent time in both South Dakota and Minnesota. Jean eventually began attending high school in both St. Paul and Pittsburgh, Pennsylvania.

During her years as a child actor in the Minneapolis theater scene, Jean spent two years under the tutelage of musical artists JD and Fred Steele, whom she credits for her vocal arrangement. She attended college early and graduated from Howard University with a degree in Sociology. At Howard, Jean was invited to Philadelphia, Pennsylvania and would soon join the band Nouveau Riche as its lead singer.

Career

2007–2009: Philadelphia and Lupe Fiasco 
During her time in Philadelphia, Jean began posting acoustic music online.  As her fanbase grew, producers Chris & Drop discovered and reached out to her. They would later introduce her to Lupe Fiasco while he was working on his second album Lupe Fiasco's The Cool (2007); she was the featuring artist on his single "Hip-Hop Saved My Life" and "Little Weapon".

On the day the album was released, Jean uploaded a video of her opening the CD for the first time; the video exploded online and she was subsequently interviewed on CNN.  From April 16, 2008, to August 6, 2008, Jean was on the Glow in the Dark Tour alongside Kanye West, Lupe Fiasco, Rihanna and N.E.R.D.

2009–2012: Pennies in a Jar 
While on tour, Jean was introduced to producer Sam Hollander and the two came up with an idea for a concept album based around the former's songwriting. Jean traveled the United States to collaborate with other songwriters. She co-wrote each song with another songwriter, including Thom Bell, Luigi Creatore, Lamont Dozier, Burt Bacharach, Jeff Barry, Carole King, Bobby Braddock, Paul Williams, Jimmy Webb, Barry Mann and Cynthia Weil, Carly Simon and Bob Dylan.

The concept was shopped to several labels and she eventually signed with Columbia Records.  Although they liked the concept, they ultimately decided not to release the album; it was instead released on July 12, 2011, on indie record label S-Curve Records, titled Pennies in a Jar. Jean was invited to open for Mayer Hawthorne on his nationwide concert tour.

Her single "My Love" reached number eight in Japan's Hot 100 Singles chart. Jean toured Japan and Australia and performed "How To Unring A Bell" on the Late Show with David Letterman to promote her album.

During the recording of Pennies in a Jar, Jean found it was getting more difficult to sing every night on tour. When she returned to Philadelphia, she was informed by her doctors she had nodules on her thyroid. Although they were not cancerous, they affected her ability to maintain her vocal training. Jean decided to undergo thyroidectomy and doctors were able to remove the thyroid and nodules without damaging her vocal cords.

2012–present: Collaborations and Champagne Water EP 
Afterwards, Jean moved to Los Angeles, California. She and Lupe Fiasco were featured on Ab-Soul's song "World Runners" from his album These Days... (2014). Jean was also featured on the songs "Little Death", "No Scratches", and "Madonna (And Other Mothers in the Hood)" from Lupe Fiasco's album Tetsuo & Youth (2015).

On October 22, 2014, Jean released "Champagne Water", the first single from the Champagne Water EP (2014), featuring Ab-Soul; it soon reached the top of the Billboard Magazine Real Time Charts. Vibe Magazine premiered Jean's new EP on November 19, 2014. The album features collaborations with Ab-Soul and Kevin Olusola of Pentatonix and was produced by artists such as Donnie Trumpet, Nate Fox, Peter Cottontale, Like and Double-0.

In February 2015, she performed "Little Death" on The Tonight Show Starring Jimmy Fallon with Lupe Fiasco and The Roots. Jean and Lupe Fiasco were featured in the first season of Hannibal Burress' Comedy Central Show Why? with Hannibal Buress. In 2017, she signed a recording contract with Rhymesayers Entertainment for the album which would become Beautiful Prison (2019).  The first single of this album, "People & Planes", was released on April 24, 2018. In late 2018, Jean was the featuring artist of several songs from Lupe Fiasco's album Drogas Wave (2018).

Discography

Albums 
Pennies in a Jar (2011)

EPs 
X-Mas EP (2013)
Champagne Water EP (2014)
Beautiful Prison (2019)

Singles 
As lead artist

As featured artist

Guest appearances

See also 
Nouveau Riche discography

Filmography

References

External links 

Musicians from Saint Paul, Minnesota
Living people
African-American women singer-songwriters
American women singer-songwriters
21st-century American singers
American rhythm and blues singer-songwriters
American women hip hop singers
American neo soul singers
1983 births
Singer-songwriters from Minnesota
21st-century American women singers
Rhymesayers Entertainment artists
21st-century African-American women singers
20th-century African-American people
20th-century African-American women